The 2012–13 Biathlon World Cup – World Cup 4 was held in Oberhof, Germany, from 3 January until 6 January 2013.

Schedule of events

Medal winners

Men

Women

Achievements

 Best performance for all time

 , 1st place in Sprint
 , 8th place in Sprint
 , 19th place in Sprint
 , 39th place in Sprint
 , 66th place in Sprint
 , 75th place in Sprint
 , 79th place in Sprint
 , 83rd place in Sprint
 , 92nd place in Sprint
 , 93rd place in Sprint
 , 95th place in Sprint
 , 6th place in Sprint
 , 9th place in Sprint
 , 11th place in Sprint
 , 19th place in Sprint
 , 25th place in Sprint
 , 26th place in Sprint
 , 34th place in Sprint
 , 35th place in Sprint
 , 44th place in Sprint
 , 46th place in Sprint
 , 51st place in Sprint
 , 71st place in Sprint
 , 2nd place in Pursuit
 , 18th place in Pursuit
 , 51st place in Pursuit

 First World Cup race

 , 87th place in Sprint
 , 90th place in Sprint
 , 96th place in Sprint
 , 73rd place in Sprint
 , 81st place in Sprint
 , 46th place in Sprint

References 

- World Cup 4
Biathlon World Cup - World Cup 4
Biathlon World Cup - World Cup 4
Sport in Oberhof, Germany
Biathlon competitions in Germany
2010s in Thuringia